Graham Edward Gardner (born 1 June 1966) is an English-born Scottish former first-class cricketer.

Gardner was born in June 1966 at Brighton. Moving to Scotland as a child, he was educated at Graeme High School in Falkirk and Larbert High School at Larbert. A club cricketer for Stenhousemuir Cricket Club, Gardner made a single appearance for Scotland in first-class cricket against Ireland at Linlithgow in 1996. Batting once in the match from the middle order, he scored an unbeaten 2 runs in the Scottish second innings. With his medium pace bowling, he took a wicket apiece in both Irish innings', dismissing Kyle McCallan in their first innings and Andrew Patterson in their second. In 2005, Gardner featured in a minor match between Clackmannan and Warwickshire as part of Dougie Brown's benefit year, with Gardner being instrumental in a surprise 8 wicket victory for Clackmannan.

References

External links
 

1966 births
Living people
Sportspeople from Brighton
Scottish people of English descent
People educated at Graeme High School
People educated at Larbert High School
Scottish cricketers